Ron Nalder (born 8 September 1939) is a former Australian rules footballer who played for Hawthorn in the VFL.  

Although mainly a centreman, Nalder also spent time across half forward and half back. He was one of Hawthorn's two reserves in their 1961 premiership and played in a losing grand final in 1963.

References

1939 births
Australian rules footballers from Victoria (Australia)
Hawthorn Football Club players
Hawthorn Football Club Premiership players
Maryborough Football Club players
Living people
One-time VFL/AFL Premiership players